Knocknabola or Knocknaboley is a townland in the parish of Kilmeena which is located between Newport and Westport in County Mayo, Ireland. As of the 2011 census, Knocknaboley had a population of 55 people.

References 

Townlands of County Mayo